Drużno  is a village in the administrative district of Gmina Elbląg, within Elbląg County, Warmian-Masurian Voivodeship, in northern Poland.

The village has a population of 90. It shares its name with Drużno Lake.

References

Villages in Elbląg County